Dina Meshreef (born 10 March 1994 in Quebec City) is an Egyptian table tennis player. She competed for Egypt at the 2012 Summer Olympics.

She attended Futures American School and Roots School. She went to the American University in Cairo. She has one brother who is also a ping pong player called Ahmed Meshref.

She reached her highest ITTF ranking of #33 in 3/2018.

She qualified to represent Egypt at the 2020 Summer Olympics.

On 10 August 2022 she signed for the Greek club Panathinaikos, competing in the European Champions League.

References

Egyptian female table tennis players
Table tennis players at the 2012 Summer Olympics
Table tennis players at the 2016 Summer Olympics
Olympic table tennis players of Egypt
1994 births
Living people
Table tennis players at the 2010 Summer Youth Olympics
Mediterranean Games gold medalists for Egypt
Mediterranean Games bronze medalists for Egypt
Competitors at the 2013 Mediterranean Games
Competitors at the 2018 Mediterranean Games
Competitors at the 2022 Mediterranean Games
African Games gold medalists for Egypt
African Games medalists in table tennis
African Games silver medalists for Egypt
African Games bronze medalists for Egypt
Mediterranean Games medalists in table tennis
Competitors at the 2011 All-Africa Games
Competitors at the 2015 African Games
Competitors at the 2019 African Games
Canadian people of Egyptian descent
Panathinaikos table tennis players
Table tennis players at the 2020 Summer Olympics
21st-century Egyptian women